Kargil may refer to:

 Kargil district, in Ladakh, Jammu and Kashmir
 Kargil town, the chief town of the district
 Kargil War, a 1999 armed conflict between India and Pakistan in the Kargil district

See also
 Cargill (disambiguation)
 LOC Kargil, a 2003 film based on the Kargil War